The Union of Evangelical Free Churches in Germany is a Baptist Christian denomination in Germany. It is affiliated with the Baptist World Alliance. The headquarters is in Wustermark.

History

The Union of Evangelical Free Churches in Germany has its origins in the first Baptist church in Hamburg founded by the German missionary Johann Gerhard Oncken in 1834. It is officially founded in 1849 as Federation of Christian communities baptized in Germany and Denmark. In 1941, the Union of Free Christians merged with the Federation to form the Union of Evangelical Free Churches in Germany. According to a denomination census released in 2020, it claimed 801 churches and 80,195 members.

See also 

 Baptists in Germany

References

External links
 Official Website

Baptist denominations in Europe
Evangelicalism in Germany